Upsurt is a Bulgarian hip-hop band founded in the beginning of 1996 by childhood friends Itso Hazarta, Butch, Bat 'Bro' Ventsi and Panchev. Their first records were recorded in Sudibula studio in January 1996. After a while, Shlevi Panchev left the band and only three members remained.

In 2019, Butch left the group, leaving only Itso and Ventsi.

Discography

Albums
 Bozdugan (1999)
 Chekai malko (2002)
 Pop-Folk (2003)
 Quattro (2005)

Other singles 
 Vtora cedka (2006)
 50 leva razhodi (2006)
 Zvezdata (2007)
 Doping test (2009)
 Mrun, mrun (2010)
 Kradi, kradi (2011)
 Bela jiga (2012)
 Oslushai se (2013)
 Tozi Tanc (2017)

Videos 
 Upsurt Live (2006)
 Koncertut na godinata (2006, split DVD with Review and Hipodil)

References

External links
 (old)
Official website (old)
"Ъпсурт" с абсурдна премиера на новото си видео

1996 establishments in Bulgaria
Bulgarian hip hop groups
Musical groups established in 1996